The Red Rose Transit Authority (RRTA) is a transit agency serving Lancaster County, Pennsylvania. RRTA is headquartered in downtown Lancaster. The South Central Transit Authority owns RRTA and the Berks Area Regional Transportation Authority (BARTA).

RRTA has routes both within the city of Lancaster, and between Lancaster and other areas of the county.  RRTA coordinates a paratransit service, Red Rose Access, which is run by three private transportation providers.  RRTA also operates a loop route in downtown Lancaster.

Outside Lancaster city, RRTA buses will stop for passengers who hail them.  Inside the city limits, riders must wait at designated stops.

History 

The RRTA was formed as an administrative agency by Lancaster city and Lancaster County under the Municipality Authorities Act of 1945. On April 1, 1976, the RRTA became an operating agency after it took over fixed-route service from two private companies. A new operations facility was built in 1979. In 1992, the RRTA consolidated with the Lancaster Integrated Specialized Transportation System, with the paratransit service renamed Red Rose Access.

The name "Red Rose" is a specific reference to the Red Rose of the House of Lancaster, associated lastly with King Henry VII of England.
 
The Queen Street Station transit center in downtown Lancaster was completed in 2005 on the former site of the Otto Paving and Construction Company building that was built in 1926. Construction on the second phase of the transit center began in September 2009, which added a parking garage, three bus bays, and access to Chestnut Street.

On December 1, 2014, the South Central Transit Authority was formed to oversee RRTA and the Berks Area Regional Transportation Authority (BARTA) in Berks County.

Route list 
Red Rose Transit Authority operates the following routes, most of which run on a hub and spoke type system out of Downtown Lancaster.

Fares 
RRTA bus fares are based on zones radiating out from Lancaster. The base cash fare is $1.70, while Zone 1 costs $1.85, Zone 2 costs $2.15, Zone 3 costs $2.50 and Zone 4 costs $2.90. Transfers to another bus route are available and cost $0.05 for the base zone, $0.20 for Zone 1, $0.50 for Zone 2, $0.85 for Zone 3, and $1.25 for Zone 4. Students in K-12 schools pay a reduced fare of $1.35 for the base zone, $1.50 for Zone 1, $1.80 for Zone 2, $2.15 for Zone 3, and $2.55 for Zone 4. Millersville University students with their university ID can ride the Route 16, MU Xpress, and MU Park City Xpress for free when the university is in session. Persons with disabilities pay half fare, which costs $0.85 for the base zone, $0.90 for Zone 1, $1.05 for Zone 2, $1.25 for Zone 3, and $1.45 for Zone 4. Senior citizens age 65 or older ride RRTA buses for free.

RRTA offers various bus passes for riders. The All Day Pass, which allows for unlimited rides in a single day, can be bought onboard buses and at sales outlets and costs $3.40 for up to two zones and $5.25 for all zones. The 10 Ride Pass, which allows for 10 one-way rides, costs $12.00 for the base zone, $13.50 for Zone 1, $15.50 for Zone 2, $18.50 for Zone 3, and $21.50 for Zone 4. The 31 Day Pass, which allows for unlimited rides over a 31-day period, costs $35.00 for the base zone, $40.00 for Zone 1, $47.00 for Zone 2, $55.00 for Zone 3, and $64.00 for Zone 4. The Half Fare 10 Ride Pass, which allows for 10 one-way rides for persons with disabilities, costs $6.00 for the base zone, $6.75 for Zone 1, $7.75 for Zone 2, $9.25 for Zone 3, and $10.75 for Zone 4.

Transit facilities

Queen Street Station 

The Queen Street Station transit center located in downtown Lancaster serves 11 of RRTA's bus routes. The transit center contains shelters and benches in a park-like setting for riders waiting for their buses. The RRTA Information Center is located at Queen Street Station and contains a waiting area, restrooms, sales outlet, bike racks, snack machines, ATM, and television. A parking garage with 395 spaces is located adjacent to Queen Street Station.

Park and ride locations 
RRTA operates nine park and ride lots across Lancaster County:
Clipper Magazine Stadium (Route 6)
Former Kmart in Columbia (Route 17)
Dutch Lanes Bowling Center (Route 11)
Former Kmart in Ephrata (Route 11)
Hawthorne Center (Route 19)
Kendig Square (Route 15)
Walmart in Lancaster (Route 14)
RRTA Operations Center (Route 3)
Willow Valley Square (Route 15)

Fleet

References

External links 
 Red Rose Transit Authority

Bus transportation in Pennsylvania
Transportation in Lancaster, Pennsylvania
Municipal authorities in Pennsylvania
Government of Lancaster County, Pennsylvania